This is a list of awards and nominations received by AOA, a South Korean girl group formed in 2012 by FNC Entertainment.

Awards and nominations

Other accolades

Listicles

References

Awards
AOA